The Portland Club is a social club at 156 State Street in Portland, Maine.

Services and facilities
The Portland Club is located in the Hunnewell-Shepley Mansion, on the south side of State Street, between Pine and Spring Streets, on the east side of Portland's West End.  The Federal style mansion was built in 1805 to a design by Alexander Parris, with later Colonial Revival updates by John Calvin Stevens.  It has housed the club since 1921.  The building is an important local work by Parris, a Boston architect who, under the direction of Joseph Ingraham, helped to define much of Portland's skyline with his beautiful structures.  The building was listed on the National Register of Historic Places in 1973.

The Portland Club holds many meetings of social and political interest. The mansion itself is home to many paintings and antiques that are original to the club, along with over 12 antique mahogany pool tables on the second floor. The Portland Club has a history of being on the top for all of the social events in Portland, as well as having the history of being one of the first clubs to bring women into the organization as The Woman's Portland Club.

The Club currently hosts seasonal dinner meetings with lectures, brunches, and various social events..

History
The Portland Club began in 1886 as Fred N. Dow and a group of influential friends decided to organize their informal gatherings into a club.  The men's purpose was to "discuss current events," and though never part of the by-laws, to promote the Republican Party agenda.  Because Republicans controlled Maine's government, the club was widely recognized as the de facto seat of political power for decades.  The club acquired the mansion in 1921 and has been the home of The Portland Club ever since.

See also

National Register of Historic Places listings in Portland, Maine

References

Houses on the National Register of Historic Places in Maine
Houses completed in 1805
Buildings and structures in Portland, Maine
1805 establishments in Massachusetts
Houses in Portland, Maine
Clubhouses in Maine
National Register of Historic Places in Portland, Maine
Historic district contributing properties in Maine